The following lists events that happened during 2018 in Venezuela.

Incumbents
 President: Nicolás Maduro
 Vice President: Tareck El Aissami and Delcy Rodríguez

Governors
Amazonas: Miguel Rodríguez
Anzoátegui: Antonio Barreto Sira
Apure: Ramón Carrizales
Aragua: Rodolfo Clemente Marco Torres
Barinas: Argenis Chávez
Bolívar: Justo Noguera Pietri
Carabobo: Rafael Lacava
Cojedes: Margaud Godoy
Delta Amacuro: Lizeta Hernández
Falcón: Víctor Clark
Guárico: José Manuel Vásquez
Lara: Carmen Meléndez 
Mérida: Ramón Guevara
Miranda: Héctor Rodríguez
Monagas: Yelitza Santaella
Nueva Esparta: Alfredo Díaz
Portuguesa: Rafael Calles
Sucre: Edwin Rojas
Táchira: Laidy Gómez
Trujillo: Henry Rangel Silva
Vargas: Jorge García Carneiro
Yaracuy: Julio León Heredia
Zulia: Omar Prieto

Events

January
January 5
Looting was recorded in different Venezuelan cities, such as the ports of Altagracia, Caicara del Orinoco, Maturín, and Terrazas del Avila, among others.
Omar Barboza was sworn in as the new President of the National Assembly.
Maduro ordered the closure of the borders with the islands of Aruba, Curaçao and Bonaire.
January 6 - The government demands shops lower prices leading to hundreds of people to take advantage of this and line up.
January 8
Claudio Fermin announced his candidacy for presidential elections.
According to the National Assembly, Venezuela's inflation is set at 2616% for 2017.
January 12 - Motorcycle gunmen kill pro-government legislator in Venezuela.
January 18
Countries of the European Union impose sanctions on Venezuelan officials, such as Néstor Reverol, Minister of Interior, Justice and peace; Maikel Moreno, president of the Supreme Court of Justice; and Diosdado Cabello, member of the United Socialist Party of Venezuela.
Relatives demanded in the morgue of Bello Monte the delivery of the bodies of the massacre of El Junquito, among which are Óscar Alberto Pérez.
Ramos Allup announced his candidacy for presidential primary.
January 20 - They were buried without death certificates, two members of the slaughter of Junquito, where Oscar Perez was murdered.
January 21
The body of Oscar Perez is buried at dawn, in the Cementerio del Este (East Cemetery).
In a terrorist attack in a hotel in Kabul, two Venezuelans died.

April
April 10 - President Nicolás Maduro announced that will not attend Summit of Américas in Lima, Peru.

May
May 20 - The 2018 Venezuelan presidential election was held with incumbent President Nicolás Maduro reelected with 67.8% of the vote.

August

August 4 - At least two drones armed with explosives detonated in the area where  president Nicolás Maduro was delivering an address to military officers in Venezuela.

October
October 2 - Per a report from the International Monetary Fund (IMF), as reported by Bloomberg, Venezuela’s annual inflation rate was predicted to surge to 1.37 million percent by the end of the year.  The prediction is up from as estimate of 1 million percent in July, and more than 100 times greater than the IMF's January estimate of 13,000 percent.   The report went on to estimate that gross domestic product would shrink 18%  in 2018.

References

 
2010s in Venezuela
Years of the 21st century in Venezuela
Venezuela
Venezuela